The 6th Rhythmic Gymnastics Asian Championships was held in Tashkent, Uzbekistan from 5–8 June 2013.

Medal winners

Medal table

Results

Team

Details

References

External links

 2013 Asian Championships Results

2013
2013 in gymnastics
Gymnastics competitions in Uzbekistan
International gymnastics competitions hosted by Uzbekistan  
2013 in Uzbekistani sport
Sport in Tashkent